The 2012 Radisson Blu Oslo Cup was held from September 20 to 23 at the Snarøen Curling Club in Oslo, Norway as part of the 2012–13 World Curling Tour. The event was held in a round robin format, and the purses of the men's and women's events were 160,000 and 100,000 krona, respectively. Niklas Edin of Sweden won the men's event for the third consecutive year, and Canada's Sherry Middaugh won the women's event.

Men

Teams
The teams are listed as follows:

Round-robin standings

Tiebreakers

Playoffs

Women

Teams
The teams are listed as follows:

Round-robin standings

Tiebreakers

Playoffs

References

External links
 

Results page

2012 in curling
International sports competitions in Oslo
2012 in Norwegian sport
Curling competitions in Norway
September 2012 sports events in Europe
2010s in Oslo